Muncey is a surname. Notable people with the surname include:

Bill Muncey (1928–1981), American hydroplane racer
Cameron Muncey (born 1980), Australian musician
George Muncey (1835–1883), English cricketer

See also
Chuck Muncie (1953–2013), American football player
Muncy (disambiguation), includes list of people with surname Muncy
Munsey (disambiguation), includes a list of people with surname Munsey